New Geneva Historic District is a national historic district located at Nicholson Township, Fayette County, Pennsylvania. The district includes 29 contributing buildings and the stone Wilson House (c. 1768). Most of the contributing buildings were built between c. 1790 and 1910, and are representative of a number of popular architectural styles including Federal and Queen Anne. The district includes 22 contributing houses, two churches, a school building, a store, a shop, a garage, and some sheds. There are also three archaeological sites associated with the former pottery works, and a historic site related to the ferry landing. The town of New Geneva was originally laid out in 1797, by Albert Gallatin.

It was added to the National Register of Historic Places in 1996.

References

Historic districts on the National Register of Historic Places in Pennsylvania
Historic districts in Fayette County, Pennsylvania
National Register of Historic Places in Fayette County, Pennsylvania